Ari Elon (Hebrew: ארי אלון) (born 1950) is an Israeli writer, a Talmud scholar and educator.

Elon was born in Jerusalem in 1950. He is the son of former Israel Supreme Court Justice Menachem Elon. Elon's brothers include the late Israeli politician, MK Benny Elon, disgraced Rabbi Mordechai Elon and Be'er Sheva District Court Judge Joseph ("Sefi") Elon . 
 
Despite his family's religious background, he became secular at a young age. He taught Talmud and Midrash at The Hebrew University of Jerusalem. Elon taught at various institutions throughout Israel, including BINA Center for Jewish Identity and Hebrew Culture, and served as the director of the Rabbinic Texts Program at the Reconstructionist Rabbinical College in Philadelphia.

Published works 
 From Jerusalem to the Edge of Heaven, Jewish Publication Society, 1996
 Trees, Earth, and Torah: A Tu B'Shvat Anthology,  (Editor) The Jewish Publication Society, 2000  
 Ba el ha-ḳodesh : 36 agadot nistarot, Yediʻot aḥaronot, 2005

References 

1950 births
Israeli biblical scholars
Israeli Jews
Jewish biblical scholars
Judaic studies
Living people
Ari
20th-century Jewish biblical scholars
21st-century Jewish biblical scholars